Chak 152P is a village in Sadiqabad, Rahim Yar Khan District, Punjab, Pakistan. In 2004, a military farm was located at Chak 152P. In 2003, a camel-fighting mela was held in the village. The village has 1515 registered voters.

References
 

Rahim Yar Khan District
Villages in Rahim Yar Khan District